Sarala Regmi is a Nepalese politician, belonging to the Communist Party of Nepal (Maoist). In January 2007 she was nominated to the interim legislature of Nepal on behalf of the pre-split CPN (Maoist) (later renamed UCPN (Maoist)). In April 2008, she won the Bardiya-1 seat in the Constituent Assembly election, defeating veteran CPN (UML) leader Bam Dev Gautam.

She belonged to the hardline faction inside UCPN (Maoist), and after the split in the party she became a Central Committee member of the new CPN (Maoist).

References

Living people
Communist Party of Nepal (Maoist Centre) politicians
Communist Party of Nepal (Maoist) (2012) politicians
21st-century Nepalese women politicians
21st-century Nepalese politicians
Nepalese atheists
Year of birth missing (living people)
Khas people

Members of the 1st Nepalese Constituent Assembly